Daisy Belle is a 2018 science fiction short film written and directed by William Wall. The film stars Lily Elsie. It qualified for an Oscar at Bermuda International Film Festival, won five Pacific Southwest Emmy Awards at National Academy of Televisions Arts and Sciences and was distributed by Dust.

Plot 
In a world full of strange creatures, a domestic robot dedicates its life to looking after Daisy Belle, its owner who has passed away.

Cast 
Lily Elsie as Daisy Belle

Production 
The film was created in San Diego using computer animation and miniatures. It's an existential film with "technical movie production challenges." Wall said he and his team brainstormed the idea of the story, making sure it fit into the scope of his usual short film budget. He made the robot "Oono" out of metal to give it a rusty, vintage look. Wall’s film includes themes of surrealism and dark fantasy.

Release 
The film screened at San Diego International Film Festival, Oceanside International Film Festival, Coronado Island Film Festival, Trieste Science+Fiction Festival, Idyllwild International Festival of Cinema, Grossmann Fantastic Film and Wine Festival, DaVinci International Film Festival, NOLA Horror Film Fest, Madeira Fantastic FilmFest, Menorca International Film Festival, Amarcort Film Festival, New Hope Film Festival, Apocalypse Later Film Festival and The Not-So-Silent Short Film Fest. It qualified for the Oscar list at Bermuda International Film Festival and was later released on Dust.

Reception

Accolades

References

External links 

 
 
 

2018 films
2018 science fiction films
American science fiction short films
2018 short films
American animated short films
2010s English-language films
Animated films about robots
Films shot in San Diego
Films set in San Diego
American dark fantasy films
American computer-animated films
2018 computer-animated films
Existentialist films
Surrealist films
American robot films
American animated science fantasy films
Films about grieving
2010s American films
Films released on YouTube